The men's 200 metres event at the 2017 Summer Universiade was held on 25 and 26 August at the Taipei Municipal Stadium in Taipei, Taiwan.

Medalists

Results

Heats
Qualification: First 2 in each heat (Q) and next 6 fastest (q) qualified for the semifinals.

Wind:Heat 1: +0.9 m/s, Heat 2: +0.3 m/s, Heat 3: -1.6 m/s, Heat 4: -1.9 m/s, Heat 5: -2.4 m/sHeat 6: +1.5 m/s, Heat 7: +2.3 m/s, Heat 8: +2.0 m/s, Heat 9: -1.9 m/s

Semifinals
Qualification: First 2 in each heat (Q) and the next 2 fastest (q) qualified for the final.

Wind:Heat 1: +3.1 m/s, Heat 2: +1.0 m/s, Heat 3: -3.2 m/s

Final

Wind: -3.8 m/s

References

Athletics at the 2017 Summer Universiade
2017